Palazzo Grimani may refer to:

Palazzo Grimani di San Luca, Venice, Italy
Palazzo Grimani di Santa Maria Formosa, Venice, Italy

Architectural disambiguation pages